The line-fronted canastero (Asthenes urubambensis) is a species of bird in the family Furnariidae. It is found in Bolivia and Peru.

Its natural habitats are subtropical or tropical moist montane forest and subtropical or tropical high-altitude grassland. It is threatened by habitat loss. Two subspecies are recognized:
Asthenes urubambensis huallagae (Zimmer 1924) - Peru
Asthenes urubambensis urubambensis (Chapman, 1919) - Peru and Bolivia

References

line-fronted canastero
Birds of the Peruvian Andes
Birds of the Bolivian Andes
line-fronted canastero
Taxonomy articles created by Polbot